Aegocidnexocentrus is a genus of beetles in the family Cerambycidae, containing a single species, Aegocidnexocentrus tippmanni. It was described by Stephan von Breuning in 1957.

References

Acanthocinini
Beetles described in 1957
Monotypic Cerambycidae genera